The Sidgwick Site is one of the largest sites within the University of Cambridge, England.

Overview and history

The Sidgwick Site is located on the western side of Cambridge city centre, near the Backs. The site is north of Sidgwick Avenue and south of West Road, and is home to several of the university's arts and humanities faculties. The site is named after the philosopher Henry Sidgwick, who studied at Cambridge in the 19th century.   The site as it is now has its origins in plans drawn up by Casson and Conder in 1952 for making use of land to the west of the Cambridge city centre which was previously used mainly for sports. Much of the site's current architecture derives from these original plans. However, many faculty buildings, especially to the north of the site, have been designed by separate architects with little reference to the coherence of the site as a whole. In July 2002, the old Faculty of English, a converted Victorian villa, was demolished, and a more practical building designed by Allies and Morrison to reflect the needs of the faculty was completed in 2004. The Alison Richard Building, completed in 2012 and designed by Nicholas Hare Architects, brings together a number of different research groups (Interdisciplinary Geographical Centres), the new department of Politics and International Studies (POLIS) and the Centre for Research in Arts, Social Sciences and Humanities (CRASSH).

On 29 October 2006, Education Not For Sale supporters at Cambridge University organised the first occupation in the UK in protest at the introduction of top-up fees on the Sidgwick Site Lecture Hall, occupying it for 12 hours. In 2009, Cambridge Gaza Solidarity occupied three lecture theatres and the common area of the Law Faculty. On 22 February 2022, Cambridge Defend Education, a student-led campaign group, occupied a lecture block declaring support for the current University and College Union strike. Cambridge Students' Union, although not directly involved in the occupation issued a statement in support of the action, declaring themselves opposed to the marketisation of education.

Although less popular now, the site was formerly a thriving location with the local skateboarding community because of its undercover benches, numerous sets of stairs and L-shaped concrete banks. These features have since been amended to discourage skateboarding.

Faculties on the Sidgwick Site

The following University of Cambridge faculties and departments are located on the site:

 Faculty of Asian and Middle Eastern Studies
 Faculty of Classics with the Museum of Classical Archaeology
 Faculty of English, incorporating the Anglo-Saxon, Norse and Celtic
 Faculty of Music
 Faculty of History
 Faculty of Law
 Department of Politics and International Studies
 Faculty of Modern & Medieval Languages
 Faculty of Economics
 Faculty of Divinity
 Faculty of Philosophy
 Institute of Criminology
 Centre of Latin American Studies

The Department of Land Economy is planned to move to the Sidgwick Site.

Facilities
The site has a buttery which sells snacks and drinks throughout the day with seating inside and a number of picnic tables outside. There is also an Origin8 which offers a soup of the day, hot panini and wraps, sandwiches, snacks, and various drinks, and a number of food and drink machines along with seating in basement of the Law faculty building. The Modern & Medieval Languages faculty has tea/coffee machines on all floors and a snack machine.

There is a student prayer room on the Sidgwick Site located at the back of Lecture Block A. Here, the University Islamic Society holds Jamaat five times a day.

See also
 Lady Mitchell Hall, a large lecture theatre on the site

References

External links
Map

University of Cambridge sites